Warren Feeney (born 1949) is a Northern Irish former footballer who played at both professional and international levels as a left winger.

Career
Born in Swansea, Wales while his father Jim was playing for Swansea Town, Feeney played between 1967 and 1982 for Ards, Linfield, Distillery, Stoke City, Glentoran and Crusaders. He was the Ulster Footballer of the Year and Northern Ireland Football Writers' Association Player of the Year for 1975–76.

He also made one appearance for Northern Ireland in 1976.

Personal life
Both Feeney's father Jim and son Warren have represented Northern Ireland at international football.

References
General
NIFG

Specific

1949 births
Living people
Association footballers from Northern Ireland
NIFL Premiership players
Northern Ireland international footballers
Ards F.C. players
Linfield F.C. players
Lisburn Distillery F.C. players
Stoke City F.C. players
Glentoran F.C. players
Crusaders F.C. players
Northern Ireland Football Writers' Association Players of the Year
Ulster Footballers of the Year
Association football wingers
Warren Sr.